This is a list of census-designated places in Rhode Island. The United States Census Bureau defines census-designated places as unincorporated communities lacking elected municipal officers and boundaries with legal status.

As of the 2020 census, Rhode Island has 28 census-designated places, up from 26 in the 2010 census. Most of the CDPs are small communities and villages inside of towns, but a few of them account for the entire area and population of their respective towns.

Census-designated places

See also 
 List of counties in Rhode Island
 List of municipalities in Rhode Island

Notes

References 

 
Census-designated places
Rhode Island